This is a demography of the population of Oman including population density, ethnicity, education level, health of the populace, economic status, religious affiliations and other aspects of the population.

About 50% of the population in Oman lives in Muscat and the Batinah coastal plain northwest of the capital; about 200,000 live in the Dhofar (southern) region; and about 30,000 live in the remote Musandam Peninsula on the Strait of Hormuz.

Since 1970, the government has given high priority to education in order to develop a domestic work force, which the government considers a vital factor in the country's economic and social progress. In 1986, Oman's first university, Sultan Qaboos University, opened. Other post secondary institutions include a law school, technical college, banking institute, teachers' training college, and health sciences institute. Some 200 scholarships are awarded each year for study abroad.

Nine private colleges exist, providing two-year post secondary diplomas. Since 1999, the government has embarked on reforms in higher education designed to meet the needs of a growing population. Under the reformed system, four public regional universities were created, and incentives are provided by the government to promote the upgrading of the existing nine private colleges and the creation of other degree-granting private colleges.

Population

Census results

UN estimates

Structure of the population

Vital statistics

UN estimates 

	
Births and deaths

Ethnic groups 
According to the CIA, Oman's population primarily consists of Arab, Baluchi, South Asian (Indian, Pakistani, Sri Lankan, Bangladeshi), and African ethnic groups.

Omani society is largely tribal. Oman has three known types of identities. Two of these identities are 'tribalism' and 'Ibadism'; the third identity is linked to 'maritime trade'. The first two identities are widespread in the interior of Oman; these identities are closely tried to tradition, as a result of lengthy periods of isolation. The third identity, which pertains to Muscat and the coastal areas of Oman, is an identity that has become embodied in business and trade. The third identity is generally seen to be more open and tolerant towards others. Thus, tension between socio-cultural groups in Omani society exists. More important is the existence of social inequality between these three groups. Gwadar, a region of Balochistan in Pakistan, was a Colony of Oman for more than a century. In 1958, Pakistan bought Gwadar from Oman for US$22.4 million, and hence many Omanis have Pakistani descent.

Migration 
Because of the combination of a relatively small local Omani population and a fast-growing oil-driven economy, Oman has attracted many migrants. At the 2014 census the total immigrant population was 1,789,000 or 43.7% of the population. Most migrants are males from India (465,660 for both sexes), Bangladesh (107,125) or Pakistan (84,658). Female migrant workers are mainly from Indonesia (25,300), the Philippines (15,651) or Sri Lanka (10,178). Migrants from Arab countries account for 68,986 migrants (Egypt 29,877, Jordan 7,403, Sudan 6,867, UAE 6,426, Iraq 4,159, Saudi Arabia 725, Bahrain 388, Qatar 168, other 12,683) and other Asian countries for 12,939 migrants. There were 8,541 migrants from Europe, 1,540 from the United States and 15,565 from other countries.

CIA World Factbook demographic statistics 

The following demographic statistics are from the CIA World Factbook, unless otherwise indicated.

Age structure
0-14 years: 30.1% (male 528,554/female 502,272)
15-24 years: 18.69% (male 335,764/female 304,207)
25-54 years: 43.8% (male 864,858/female 635,006)
55-64 years: 3.92% (male 71,477/female 62,793)
65 years and over: 3.49% (male 58,561/female 60,894) (2017 est.)

Median age
total: 25.6 years
male: 26.6 years
female: 24.2 years (2017 est.)

Birth rate

24 births/1,000 population (2017 est.)

Death rate

3.3 deaths/1,000 population (2017 est.)

Population growth rate

2.03% (2017 est.)

Urbanization
urban population: 84.5% of total population (2018)
rate of urbanisation: 5.25% annual rate of change (2015-20 est.)

Sex ratio
at birth: 1.05 male(s)/female
0-14 years: 1.05 male(s)/female
15-24 years: 1.1 male(s)/female
25-54 years: 1.38 male(s)/female
55-64 years: 1.14 male(s)/female
65 years and over: 0.99 male(s)/female
total population: 1.19 male(s)/female (2017 est.)

Infant mortality rate

total: 12.8 deaths/1,000 live births
male: 13.1 deaths/1,000 live births
female: 12.5 deaths/1,000 live births (2017 est.)

Life expectancy at birth

total population: 75.7 years
male: 73.7 years
female: 77.7 years (2017 est

Obesity - adult prevalence rate

 27% (2016)

Children under the age of 5 years underweight

 9.7% (2014)

Nationality 
noun:
Omani(s)
adjective:
Omani

Religion 

Islam 85.9% (official; 45% Ibadi Muslims, 45% Sunni Muslims and 5% Shia Muslims), Christianity 6.5%, Hindu 5.5%, Buddhist 0.8%, Judaism <0.1, Other 1%, Unaffiliated 0.2%

Languages 
Arabic (official), Bangla, English, Hindi, Malayalam, Balochi, Swahili, Urdu, Sindhi, Gujarati, Jadgali, Achomi, Shehri, Tamil and other Indian languages

Literacy 
definition:
Literacy has been described as the ability to read for knowledge and write coherently and think critically about the written word.
total population: 91.1%
male: 93.6%
female: 85.6% (2015 est.)

Overseas Omani people 
Today several thousand Omani-born people have emigrated abroad. The figures are shown below (only countries with more than 100 Omani-born residents are listed).

See also 

 Freedom of religion in Oman
 Religion in Oman
 Islam in Oman

References

External links

Government 
Omani Ministry of Foreign Affairs

 
Society of Oman